Hendrik Jan "Erik" Regtop (born 16 February 1968) is a Dutch retired professional footballer who played as a forward. During his playing career, Regtop played professionally in the Netherlands, England, Switzerland, France and Austria, making nearly 400 league appearances in his career. Regtop is active as a football manager, and manages Austrian side Rot-Weiß Rankweil.

Playing career
Regtop was born in Schoonebeek, Drenthe. He played in the Netherlands for Ajax, Telstar, FC Groningen and SC Heerenveen, in England for Bradford City, in Switzerland for FC St. Gallen, FC Altstätten and FC Montlingen, in France for OGC Nice, and in Austria for SC Austria Lustenau, SC Bregenz and SC Rheindorf Altach.

Coaching career
Regtop was appointed player-manager of Swiss club FC Altstätten in 2005. He then moved to current club FC Montlingen, also as a player-manager, in 2007.

References

External links
 
 

1968 births
Living people
Dutch footballers
Association football forwards
Eredivisie players
Eerste Divisie players
English Football League players
Ligue 2 players
Swiss Super League players
Austrian Football Bundesliga players
AFC Ajax players
FC Groningen players
SC Heerenveen players
Bradford City A.F.C. players
FC St. Gallen players
OGC Nice players
SW Bregenz players
SC Rheindorf Altach players
SC Telstar players
Dutch expatriate footballers
Expatriate footballers in England
Expatriate footballers in France
Expatriate footballers in Switzerland
Expatriate footballers in Austria
Dutch expatriate football managers
Dutch football managers
Footballers from Emmen, Netherlands